Pascal Engel (born 1954) is a French philosopher, working on the philosophy of language, philosophy of mind, epistemology and philosophy of logic. He was a professor of philosophy of logic at the Sorbonne. He currently works at the University of Geneva, where he collaborates with, among others, Kevin Mulligan. He is a member of Institut Nicod.

Books
Va savoir - De la connaissance en général, Paris, Hermann, 2007
A quoi bon la verité (with R. Rorty), Paris, Grasset, 2005 (Published in English as What's the Use of Truth?)
Truth, Durham, Acumen, 2002
Ramsey. Vérité et succès (with J. Dokic), Paris, PUF, 2001
La verite, reflexions sur quelques truismes, Hatier, 1998
La dispute, une introduction à la philosophie analytique, Paris, Minuit 1997
Philosophie et psychologie, Paris, Gallimard, Folio, 1996
Introduction à la philosophie de l'esprit, Paris, La Découverte, 1994
Donald Davidson et la philosophie du langage, Paris, P.U.F., 1994
La Norme du vrai, philosophie de la logique, Paris, Gallimard, 1989
Identité et référence, la théorie des noms propres chez Frege et Kripke, Paris, Presses de l’Ecole Normale Supérieure, 1985

External links
 Pascal Engel at the University of Geneva
 Liber Amicorum (2014)
Interview at 3:AM Magazine

1954 births
Living people
People from Aix-en-Provence
École Normale Supérieure alumni
Academic staff of the University of Paris
Academic staff of the University of Geneva
Analytic philosophers
20th-century French philosophers
21st-century French philosophers
21st-century French writers
French male non-fiction writers